Aleksandar "Aco" Petrović (born 16 February 1959) is a Croatian professional basketball coach and former player who is currently the head coach of the Croatia men's national team.

Playing career
A point guard or shooting guard, Petrović had achieved prominence in the 1980s and early 1990s. The pro clubs he played for included: Šibenka, Cibona, Scavolini Pesaro, Novi Zagreb and Racing Luxembourg. He was among the 105 player nominees for the 50 Greatest EuroLeague Contributors list.

Coaching career

Petrović started his club head coaching career with Cibona in 1991. Between 1995 and 1997, he coached the Spanish ACB League team Caja San Fernando, before returning to Cibona for the 1997–98 season. 

In the 2001–02 season, he went to Poland to coach Anwil Włocławek. In 2004 he was again as head coach in Spain, that time with Caprabo Lleida. In 2006 he took over the Italian Serie A team Carifac Fabriano, before switching to Eurorida Scafati. In the 2007–08 season, he took over the Croatian A-1 Liga team Zadar. He then became head coach of Cedevita. He was named the EuroCup Coach of the Year in 2011.

Following the departure of Božidar Maljković, Petrović once again took charge over Cedevita on 26 November 2012. After Cedevita was eliminated from the EuroLeague and national cup and left without any chance of qualifying for the ABA League final four, Petrović offered his resignation to the club, which was accepted on 3 March 2013.

On 16 December 2013, Petrović was named head coach of the Lithuanian team Lietuvos rytas. Following a 91–92 national cup final game loss to Prienai, he was sacked on 31 March 2014.

On 16 July 2021, Petrović was named head coach for Victoria Libertas Pesaro of the Italian Serie A.

National team coaching
In February 2012, Petrović was appointed head coach of the senior men's Bosnia and Herzegovina national team, guiding them at the 2013 EuroBasket in Slovenia. In November 2013, the Basketball Federation of Bosnia and Herzegovina sacked him.

Petrović had coached the Croatia men's national basketball team on three occasions; in 1995, when Croatia finished third in EuroBasket, from 1999 to 2001, when they finished seventh in the 2001 EuroBasket and from 2016 to 2017. 

On 23 March 2016, Petrović was named head coach of the senior men's Croatia national team for the third time in his head coaching career. In August 2016, Croatia managed to reach the 2016 Summer Olympics tournament surprisingly winning qualifying tournament in Turin. At the Olympic finals, Croatia lost in the quarterfinal game of the tournament from Serbia. On 15 September 2017, following a defeat to host Russia in the round of 16 at EuroBasket, Petrović resigned from Croatia bench.

In October 2017, a month after leaving Croatia, Petrović was named head coach of the Brazil men's national basketball team, which he led at the 2019 World Cup in China, but failed to qualify for the 2020 Summer Olympics tournament through the qualifying tournament in Split.

On 24 October 2022, Petrović was named interim head coach of the Croatia men's national team, being appointed to that role for the fourth time in his coaching career.

Personal life
Aleksandar Petrović was born in Šibenik as the first child in the family of mother Biserka (née Mikulandra), and father Jovan "Jole" Petrović. His father, of Serb ethnicity, was born in 1927 in Trebinje, Bosnia and Herzegovina. His mother, of Croat ethnicity, was born in 1941 in the village of Bilice, Croatia, a municipality based few kilometres west from Aleksandar's hometown of Šibenik. His younger brother, Dražen, who died in a June 1993 car accident, was also a professional basketball player.

Petrović's cousin is the prominent Serbian former basketball player and current executive Dejan Bodiroga. Aleksandar's paternal grandfather Jovan and Dejan's paternal grandmother Gospava were siblings. Petrović's wife is Jadranka, whom he married in 1985. The couple have two children: a daughter Lina and son Marko, who is also a professional basketball player.

Aleksandar's father, Jovan, died in April 2021 after a long illness.

See also 
50 Greatest EuroLeague Contributors (2008)

References

External links

EuroLeague Coaching Profile

1959 births
Living people
Basketball players at the 1984 Summer Olympics
BC Rytas coaches
Bosnia and Herzegovina basketball coaches
Croatian basketball coaches
Croatian expatriate basketball people in Italy
Croatian expatriate basketball people in Lithuania
Croatian expatriate basketball people in Spain
Croatian expatriate basketball people in Bosnia and Herzegovina
Croatian expatriate basketball people in Poland
Croatian men's basketball players
Croatian people of Serbian descent
KK Cedevita coaches
KK Cibona coaches
KK Cibona players
KK Šibenik players
KK Zadar coaches
KK Zagreb players
Medalists at the 1984 Summer Olympics
Olympic basketball players of Yugoslavia
Olympic bronze medalists for Yugoslavia
Olympic medalists in basketball
Point guards
Shooting guards
Basketball players from Šibenik
Victoria Libertas Pallacanestro players
Yugoslav men's basketball players
1982 FIBA World Championship players
1986 FIBA World Championship players
Universiade medalists in basketball
Universiade gold medalists for Yugoslavia
Universiade silver medalists for Yugoslavia
Universiade bronze medalists for Yugoslavia
Medalists at the 1979 Summer Universiade
Medalists at the 1981 Summer Universiade
Medalists at the 1987 Summer Universiade